The Rondo for Violin and Strings, D 438, is a composition in A major by Franz Schubert. He wrote the rondo in 1816. Like the roughly contemporary Adagio and Rondo concertante in F major, D 487, the work is a concertante piece designed to highlight the skills of the violin soloist.

Background

Schubert composed the piece in 1816, along with a number of other works featuring a violin soloist including the three sonatinas (D 384/385 & D 408) and the Konzertstück in D major, D 345. It is believed that the work was composed with the intent that either the composer himself or his brother Ferdinand would take the soloist's part.

The piece was unpublished during the composer's lifetime, not seeing publication until 1897, when Breitkopf & Härtel published it in an edition edited by Eusebius Mandyczewski.

Structure

The composition, which is written for a violin soloist and an accompanying group made up of violins, violas & cellos, is structured as a single multi-tempo movement divided into two sections, the Introduction (Marked: Adagio) and the Rondo (Marked: Allegro giusto). It takes around 13 – 15 minutes to perform.

References
Notes

Sources

External links

Orchestral works by Franz Schubert
Chamber music by Franz Schubert
Compositions for string orchestra
Compositions for string quintet
1816 compositions
Compositions in A major
Compositions by Franz Schubert published posthumously